Florian Marinescu (born 1930) was a Romanian footballer who played as a defender.

International career
Florian Marinescu played one friendly match for Romania, on 25 May 1952 under coach Gheorghe Popescu I in a 1–0 victory against Poland.

Honours
Flacăra Ploiești
Divizia B: 1953

References

External links
 

1930 births
Possibly living people
Romanian footballers
Romania international footballers
Place of birth missing (living people)
Association football defenders
Liga I players
Liga II players
FC Petrolul Ploiești players